Györgyi Sebestyén (born 27 November 1974 in Szekszárd) is a Hungarian former football midfielder. She previously played most notably for 1.FC Femina and Astra Hungary FC.

Named Hungarian Footballer of the Year in 1996, she was a member of the Hungarian national team for more than a decade.

Titles
 8 Hungarian Leagues (1996, 1997, 2001, 2002, 2003, 2006, 2007, 2008)
 1 Hungarian Cup (1996)

References

1974 births
Living people
Hungarian women's footballers
Women's association football midfielders
1. FC Femina players
Astra Hungary FC players
Hungary women's international footballers
People from Szekszárd
Sportspeople from Tolna County